Ha Si Lao is a paralympic athlete from China competing mainly in category F44 throwing events.

Ha Si Lao has competed at three Paralympics, winning one medal in each.  His first games were in 1996 where as well as competing in the shot and discus he won the F43-44 javelin.  In 2000 Summer Paralympics he again competed in all three throws and added a leg of the 4 × 100 m but only managed in winning silver in the javelin.  His third appearance came in the 2004 Summer Paralympics where he again competed in all three throws and this time won a bronze medal in the discus.

References

External links
 

Paralympic athletes of China
Athletes (track and field) at the 1996 Summer Paralympics
Athletes (track and field) at the 2000 Summer Paralympics
Athletes (track and field) at the 2004 Summer Paralympics
Paralympic gold medalists for China
Paralympic silver medalists for China
Paralympic bronze medalists for China
Chinese male sprinters
Chinese male discus throwers
Chinese male javelin throwers
Living people
Medalists at the 1996 Summer Paralympics
Medalists at the 2000 Summer Paralympics
Year of birth missing (living people)
Medalists at the 2004 Summer Paralympics
Paralympic medalists in athletics (track and field)
Sprinters with limb difference
Discus throwers with limb difference
Javelin throwers with limb difference
Paralympic sprinters
Paralympic discus throwers
Paralympic javelin throwers
21st-century Chinese people